Jaltomata werffii is a plant species endemic to the Galápagos Islands in Ecuador. The epithet was spelled "werfii" in the original publication, but was corrected to "werffii" later, per Article 60.1 of the Code. The single "f" was a typographical error, as the plant was named in honor of Henk van der Werff.

Jaltomata werffii is an herb up to 1 m tall. Flowers are borne in axillary umbels of 3-4 white flowers. Fruits are orange.

References

werffii
Flora of the Galápagos Islands
Endemic flora of Ecuador